Lisa Edwards (born 19 October 1992) is a New Zealand rugby league footballer who played for the New Zealand Warriors in the NRL Women's Premiership. She primarily plays as a er.

Playing career
In June 2018, while playing for the Mt Albert Lions, Edwards was selected for the New Zealand wider squad. In August 2018, Edwards joined the New Zealand Warriors NRL Women's Premiership team.

In Round 2 of the 2018 NRL Women's season, Edwards made her debut for the Warriors in a 10–22 loss to the St George Illawarra Dragons.

On 22 October 2018, Edwards was named in the New Zealand Māori Ferns train on squad following the National Māori Tournament.

In 2019, she played for the Auckland Vulcans at the National Women's Tournament.

References

1992 births
Living people
New Zealand female rugby league players
Rugby league wingers
New Zealand Warriors (NRLW) players